John Smith (4 January 1939 – February 1988) was an English footballer.

Born in Shoreditch, London, Smith was a product of the Academy of West Ham United. He played for the east London club between 1956 and 1960, playing right half and inside right, and was a key figure in the team that won the Second Division in 1957-58. He made 136 appearances for the club, scoring 23 goals.

Smith transferred to Tottenham Hotspur, where he was one of 17 players to represent the club in their Double winning season of 1960–61. Smith played in the Swindon Town side which beat Arsenal in the 1969 Football League Cup Final.

At the time of his death he was the steward of McVitie's social club in Park Royal, north west London.

Honours 
 Swindon Town
Football League Cup
Winners: 1969

References

External links 

1939 births
1988 deaths
English footballers
England under-23 international footballers
Association football midfielders
Footballers from Shoreditch
West Ham United F.C. players
Tottenham Hotspur F.C. players
Coventry City F.C. players
Leyton Orient F.C. players
Torquay United F.C. players
Swindon Town F.C. players
Walsall F.C. managers
English Football League players
Dundalk F.C. players
League of Ireland players
Dundalk F.C. managers
League of Ireland managers
English Football League managers
English football managers
Walsall F.C. players